Wigert is a surname. Notable people with the surname include:

Carl Severin Wigert (1871–1941), American mathematician
Knut Wigert (1916–2006), Norwegian actor
Sofie Helene Wigert (1913–1989), Norwegian ship owner, Riksmål activist, and magazine editor
Sonja Wigert (1913–1980), Norwegian-Swedish actress